Aaron Maria Leitmannstetter (born 5 April 1993) is a German professional golfer. He played on the European Challenge Tour during 2018.

Amateur career
Leitmannstetter was born and brought up in Maitenbeth, Germany and started playing golf very early. At the age of one and a half, he picked up the club for the first time. He represented the German national team in the years of 2010 and 2011. As an amateur he won the Hellenic Amateur Championship in 2009 and reached the semi-finals of the Boys Amateur Championship in 2010, losing to the eventual winner, Adrián Otaegui.

Professional career
Leitmannstetter professional in 2013. He won the Ghala Open on 2016 MENA Golf Tour with a score of 10 under par.

Amateur wins
2009 Hellenic Amateur Championship

Professional wins (1)

MENA Tour wins (1)

Team appearances
Amateur
European Boys Team Championship (representing Germany): 2011

References

External links

German male golfers
People from Mühldorf (district)
Sportspeople from Upper Bavaria
1993 births
Living people